Monnina obovata is a species of plant in the family Polygalaceae. It is endemic to Ecuador.

References

obovata
Flora of Ecuador
Vulnerable plants
Taxonomy articles created by Polbot